Mount Gray is a  mountain summit located on the western border of Kootenay National Park in the  Vermilion Range, which is a sub-range of the Canadian Rockies in British Columbia, Canada. Its nearest higher peak is Tumbling Peak,  to the southeast. The mountain is part of what is known as the Rockwall which is an escarpment of the Vermilion Range.

Geology

Mount Gray is composed of Ottertail limestone, a sedimentary rock laid down during the Cambrian period and pushed east and over the top of younger rock during the Laramide orogeny.

History

"Mount Cambria" or "Cambria Peak" were names originally proposed in 1918 for the mountain by Charles Doolittle Walcott because it was formed entirely of Cambrian rocks. However, the mountain's name was officially adopted in 1924 by the Geographical Names Board of Canada to honor William J. Gray, a University of British Columbia student and founding member of the British Columbia Mountaineering Club who drowned in the Kootenay River on July 10, 1917, along with Charles Wales Drysdale when their raft capsized and both were swept away while working on a geologic field survey.  Mount Drysdale and Mount Gray form the buttresses on opposite sides of Wolverine Pass.

Climate

Based on the Köppen climate classification, Mount Gray is located in a subarctic climate zone with cold, snowy winters, and mild summers.

References

External links
 Parks Canada web site: Kootenay National Park
 Weather: Mount Gray

Gray
Gray
Kootenay Land District